Coleophora hoeneella is a moth of the family Coleophoridae. It is found in Tibet.

The wingspan is about 15 mm.

References

hoeneella
Moths described in 1989
Moths of Asia